Pennewill is a surname. Notable people with the surname include:

 Simeon S. Pennewill (1867–1935), American farmer and politician
 William Ellison Pennewill (1907–1942), American aviator
 USS Pennewill, an American World War II-era ship